Ronald Richardson Potter MA ARCO (12 July 1879 - 4 May 1911) was a Scottish organist and composer based in England.

Life
He was born on 12 July 1879 in Bothwell, Lanarkshire, the son of John Alexander Potter and Christina Gladstone Richardson. He studied at Oxford University and graduated in 1902.

He died at the young age of 31 on 4 May 1911 whilst in office as organist of Hexham Abbey.

Appointments
Organist of Hexham Abbey 1909 - 1911

Compositions
His compositions include compositions for choir and organ.

References

1879 births
1911 deaths
Scottish organists
British male organists
Scottish composers
People from Bothwell
Alumni of the University of Oxford